Syltefjorden or Syltefjord may refer to:

Places
Syltefjorden (Møre og Romsdal), a fjord in Vanylven municipality in Møre og Romsdal county, Norway
Syltefjorden (Finnmark), a fjord in Båtsfjord municipality in Finnmark county, Norway
Nordfjord, Finnmark (also known as Syltefjord), an abandoned fishing village in Båtsfjord municipality in Finnmark county, Norway
Syltefjord Chapel, a chapel in Båtsfjord municipality in Finnmark county, Norway